Cotilda Inapo is a Ugandan female stand-up comedian, actress, freelance copywriter, motivational speaker and events host (or MC) who joined professional comedy in 2009 as the first officially recognized female standup Comedienne in Uganda. She was a regular with the Crackers whose performances were broadcast as the "Mic Check" comedy show on NTV and NBS from 2010 to 2013

In 2013 , she founded the Queens of Comedy Uganda a platform to mentor female talent with the main focus on female comedians.

In the same year she also became a breakfast radio show host for Galaxy FM 100.2 a prominent urban youth station in Kampala Uganda.

Concurrently 2013 was the year she became the creative director for Anne Kansiime, a leading African female Comedienne a role she held until 2018.

2014 to 2017 she was a regular performer and one of the directors at Comedy Files a comedy unit that performed weekly at Theatre La Bonita in Kampala, Uganda.

2018 to date has seen her broaden her contribution in the arts arena through film, events hosting and comedy tours across the globe.

Career
Cotilda is the founder of Queens of Comedy Uganda a platform that mentors female talent especially comedians.

She has performed in Zambia, Kenya (Churchill Show), Nigeria (Night Of A Thousand Laughs alongside comedians like Basketmouth in 2012) and Malawi (hosted with Teacher Mpamiire and Anne Kansiime). 

She worked as a Creative Director for Anne Kansiime from 2013 to 2018.

Her content is available on all social media platforms namely YouTube, Facebook, Twitter, TikTok, Instagram and LinkedIn at the handle "Cotilda Comedy".

Personal life
Cotilda has a son.

References

Ugandan stand-up comedians
Ugandan women comedians